Leonard Howard (18 April 1886 – 14 August 1945) was an Australian cricketer. He played in six first-class matches for South Australia between 1908 and 1914.

See also
 List of South Australian representative cricketers

References

External links
 

1886 births
1945 deaths
Australian cricketers
South Australia cricketers
Cricketers from Adelaide